Pupul Bhuyan (born on 23 February 1992) is an Indian actress, television presenter, and model who has mostly appeared in Odia films, telefilms, daily shops, and reality shows. She started her film career in Ollywood in 2013 through the 1st Odia 3D film Kaunri Kanya along with Kavya Keeran. In 2018, she was crowned as the winner at Opera Mrs. India Global pageant.

Early life 
She was born on 23 February 1992 at Sainkul village of Keonjhar district of Odisha to BataKrishna Bhuyan and Baijayantimala Bhuyan. She is a graduate from the Buxi Jagabandhu Bidyadhar College, Bhubaneswar. In 2016, she married Deep Thadani.

Career 
Bhuyan started her career as a stage presenter and then hosted some solo television shows like E-News, Apananka Pasand, etc. Later she started hosting reality shows like SaReGaMaPa little Champs, Swara Odishara, Mun bi Heroine Hebi, etc.

In 2013, she debuted in Odia film industry in a lead role through the first Odia 3D film, Kaunri Kanya directed by Somya Ranjan Sahu. Later she played some character roles in Odia movies like Blackmail, Bidyarana, etc. Anubhav - a loverboy and Niyati are her upcoming Odia movies, where she is playing some important roles.

Apart from anchoring and acting, she is active in modeling. In 2018, she had participated the Opera Mrs. India Global pageant and won that. Apart from the crown, she had won the best ramp walk award in the semifinal. In 2022 she was featured on the cover photo an Odia magazine, Shubhapallaba. Before that, in 2016, she was featured on Kadambini magazine.

Filmography

Television

Awards 

 Rupanagara Mahanagara Award for Best Female Debut
 Show Time Award for Best Dubut Female
 Opera Mrs India Global 2018

References

External links 

1992 births
Living people
People from Kendujhar district
Indian film actresses
Indian television actresses
Actresses from Odisha
Actresses in Odia cinema
Actresses in Odia television
Female models from Odisha
21st-century Indian actresses